The NOMAD was a range of digital audio players designed and sold by Creative Technology Limited, and later discontinued in 2004. Subsequent players now fall exclusively under the MuVo and ZEN brands.

The NOMAD series consisted of two distinct brands:

 NOMAD (and later NOMAD MuVo) - Players that use flash memory. This brand eventually became the MuVo line.
 NOMAD Jukebox - Players that use microdrives. The brand evolved into the ZEN line.

NOMAD and NOMAD MuVo 

These models appear as a USB mass storage device to the operating system so that the device can be accessed like any other removable disk, a floppy disk for example. Older MuVo devices and all Jukebox models use a custom protocol named PDE (Portable Digital Entertainment, a Creative internal device designation) that requires the installation of drivers before the device can be recognised by the operating system.

Creative's foray into the MP3 player market began with the Creative NOMAD, a rebranded Samsung Electronics Yepp YP-D40 player with 64 megabytes of solid-state memory.

IEEE 1284 Parallel port connection
Creative NOMAD

USB 1.1 connection
Creative NOMAD II - Included FM radio and 64MB of memory via bundled Smart Media card. No internal memory.
Creative NOMAD IIc - Same appearance as Nomad II, but with no FM radio and 64MB or 128MB internal memory.
Creative NOMAD II MG
Creative NOMAD MuVo
Creative NOMAD MuVo NX

USB 2.0 connection
Creative NOMAD MuVo2
Creative NOMAD MuVo2 X-Trainer
Creative NOMAD MuVo2 FM
Creative NOMAD MuVo USB 2.0
Creative NOMAD MuVo TX
Creative NOMAD MuVo TX (Second Edition)
Creative NOMAD MuVo TX FM
Creative NOMAD Muvo Micro V200
Creative NOMAD MuVo Micro v100
Creative NOMAD Muvo Micro N200

NOMAD Jukebox Zen

Later NOMAD Jukeboxes used Creative's own firmware. Most players use Texas Instruments TMS320DA25x ARM plus digital signal processor as their CPU and support some version of Creative's environmental audio extensions (EAX). It beat Apple Computer's hard drive music player "iPod" to market by about a year.

The NOMAD Jukeboxes have varied in their use of connections. The Jukebox 3 and Jukebox Zen were unusual in their use of the older USB 1.1 standard despite their predecessor, the NOMAD Jukebox 2, having used the newer USB 2.0 standard. Part of the reason for this was the inclusion of a FireWire connection, which is of comparable speed to USB 2.0.

USB 1.1 connection
Creative NOMAD Jukebox (Creative Digital Audio Player in Europe)
Creative NOMAD Jukebox 3 (also features a FireWire connection)
Creative NOMAD Jukebox Zen (also features a FireWire connection)

USB 2.0 connection
Creative NOMAD Jukebox 2
Creative NOMAD Jukebox Zen USB 2.0
Creative NOMAD Jukebox Zen NX
Creative NOMAD Jukebox Zen Xtra

A variant of the NOMAD Jukebox was also sold as an OEM product by Dell under the name Dell Digital Jukebox (Dell DJ), a USB 2.0 device. The Second Generation Dell DJ and Dell Pocket DJ 5 are also OEM products from Creative.

The NOMAD Jukebox shipped in the U.S. in September 2000. By January 2001, Creative reported that it had sold 100,000 units.

Future versions in the Creative ZEN line exclusively use Microsoft's Media Transfer Protocol (also known as PlaysForSure), and some legacy devices have been supplied with firmware upgrades to support MTP. The first NOMAD player and the first NOMAD Jukebox use proprietary protocols, neither PDE or MTP.

Related software

Besides the NOMAD Explorer or MediaSource programs included with the devices, there are other programs which can be used to manage the player and to transfer data.

Bundled software

 Creative NOMAD Explorer - Software included with older NOMAD models and used to transfer music and data to the device. This has since been replaced by Creative MediaSource
 Creative MediaSource - A fully featured audio player for Microsoft Windows that also manages NOMAD devices and can be used to transfer media to the device or to synchronise playlists with the device - a feature that was unavailable in the previous NOMAD Explorer software.

Free software

For early models

The NOMAD Manager Project is a program to control the original NOMAD player under Linux

The Nomad II Linux USB driver - for using the Nomad II under Linux

For NOMAD Jukeboxes

libnjb is the driver underlying most of the following programs
Amarok is a music player for Linux
Banshee is a music player for Linux
Gnomad is a Jukebox Manager for Linux
Neutrino is another Jukebox Manager for Linux
XNJB is a Jukebox Manager for Mac OS X
Nomadsync is a Jukebox synchronization tool for both Microsoft Windows and Linux
Creative Nomad Jukebox KIO::Slave is an integration driver for KDE
JBHTTP is a webserver interface to Jukeboxes that is similar to what Notmad Explorer (see below) did for Microsoft Windows
Apple's iTunes  is also capable of controlling the Nomad Jukebox.
Proprietary software

Notmad Explorer by Red Chair Software is a (now defunct) jukebox management program for Microsoft Windows. The program was notable for fully integrating NOMAD devices into Windows Explorer, providing a web-based interface to the device and providing search capabilities using a built-in SQL database

See also
Creative Technology Limited
Creative ZEN
Creative MuVo

References

External links
 Linux and digital audio players
 We Test Drive the Creative Nomad Jukebox - November 2000 MP3 Newswire review of Creative's Nomad Jukebox
 Sharky Extreme Nomad Review October 2000 - Nomad Jukebox Review

Digital audio players
Creative Technology products
Singaporean brands
Consumer electronics brands
Jukebox-style media players